Joseph Emile Roude (18 December 1926 – 5 December 1998) was a French boxer. He competed in the men's light heavyweight event at the 1948 Summer Olympics. At the 1948 Summer Olympics, he lost to Israel Quitcón of Puerto Rico.

References

External links
 

1926 births
1998 deaths
French male boxers
Olympic boxers of France
Boxers at the 1948 Summer Olympics
Place of birth missing
Light-heavyweight boxers
Sportspeople from Savoie